Manikeswari is one of the popular Hindu deities in Odisha.  There are many Manikeswari temples present in Western and Southern part of Odisha.  Manikeswari temple in Bhawanipatna of Kalahandi District is well recognized in Odisha. Manikeswari is the primary deity associated with the royal family of Kalahandi Kingdom, Chakrakota Kingdom and Paralakhemundi kingdom. Chhatar Jatra is one of the most popular festivals of Manikeswari at Bhawanipatna. Khandasadhaka is a festival associated with Manikeswari in Paralakhemundi.

History
The deity of Chakrakot amandala comprising present days Kalahandi, Koraput and Bastar was Manikya debi or Manikeswari around 10th century A.D. 

Later on the king of Kalahandi Harichandra Deo struggled and died because of which his pregnant queen left for her father’s house in Gadapur, Phulbani. Some part of Phulbani was part of Mahakantara in ancient times. Though capital of Chakrakotamandala is still being debated, it is clear that it has many similar with Kamala Mandala, another ancient name of Kalahandi, Manikya Devi came to Gadapur perhaps due to influence of Chakrakota Mandala. Later, the queen and her son, Ramchandra Deo returned with  Manikya Debi or Manikeswari as per Kalahandi’s public request that time. Manikeswari was brought from Gadapur (Phulbani) around 1200 A.D. and it was located in Kalahandi. Manikeswari was also popularized by Suryabansi Gajapati in 15th-16th century in Puri region. Purushottama Deva Gajapati considered Manikeswari as consort of Lord Jagannath and made a shrine of Manikeswari at Chilika, now doesn’t exist. Manikeswari is royal family deity of Parlakhemundi. Manikeswari was installed in Bhawanipatna much later around 1849 AD during shifting of the capital from Junagarh. Some people also mention Manikeswari in Thumaul Rampur as Adipitha and Devi was brought to Bhawanipatna from there. Uditnarayan Deo laid the foundation of the present modern temple in Bhawanipatna and it was completed in 1947 by Brajamohan Deo. Manikeswari was associated with Kalahandi history as a goddess of wealth, Manik, since 10th century. There is some debate to relate Manikeswari with Stambeswari temple in Asurgarh-Narla around 5-6th century as well as Maningeeswari in Banapur in Puri. There are many Manikeswari worshiping locations in many place of Odisha and Chhattisgarh, especially in undivided districts of Koraput, Phulbani, Boudh, Bolangir, Sonepur, Ganjam, Gajapati, Angul, Dhenkanal, Keonjhar, Sundergarh, etc. due to influence by various rulers. Though Manikeswari has much historical significance in Odisha and Chhattisgarh, it has not yet fully been appreciated.

Manikeswari Temples
Bhawanipatna
Paralakhemundi
Thuamul Rampur
Jugasaipatna
Himgir, Sundargarh

Chhatar Jatra
Every year a festival called “Chhatar Jatra” at a particular time is organised and many people who have fulfilled wishes come and sacrifice animals in the name of goddess.
Chatar jatra is celebrated during September–October, Durga Puja, in Bhawanipatna.

References

Hindu temples in Odisha
Hindu gods